Neville Maynard (born 19 January 1930) is a Guyanese cricketer. He played in two first-class matches for British Guiana in 1952/53.

See also
 List of Guyanese representative cricketers

References

External links
 

1930 births
Living people
Guyanese cricketers
Guyana cricketers
Sportspeople from Georgetown, Guyana